Aleksey Maslov (born 7 February 1966) is a Russian alpine skier. He competed in three events at the 1992 Winter Olympics, representing the Unified Team.

References

External links
 

1966 births
Living people
Russian male alpine skiers
Olympic alpine skiers of the Unified Team
Alpine skiers at the 1992 Winter Olympics
People from Chusovoy
Sportspeople from Perm Krai